Odostomella metata is a species of sea snail, a marine gastropod mollusk in the family Pyramidellidae, the pyrams and their allies.

Distribution
This marine species is endemic to New Zealand.

References

 Schander, C.; Hori, S.; Lundberg, J. (1999). Anatomy and phylogeny of Odostomella and Herviera (Mollusca, Heterogastropoda, Pyramidellidae), with a description of a new species of Odostomella. Ophelia. 51(1), 39-76 page(s): 57

External links
 To World Register of Marine Species

Pyramidellidae
Gastropods of New Zealand
Gastropods described in 1907